Portoferraio lighthouse, called Faro del Forte Stella Lighthouse since is placed on the northern rampart of Forte Stella built in 1548 by Cosimo I de' Medici in Portoferraio, Elba.

Description
The lighthouse was built by Leopod II Grand Duke of Tuscany in 1788; the light stone tower is 25 metres high and has a double balcony and lantern and was restored in 1915. 
On the same tower is an additional light identified by the number 2072.2 E.F. that emits a red fixed light at 60 metres above sea level to warn the ships about the Capo Bianco shoal.

See also
 List of lighthouses in Italy

References

External links
 Servizio Fari Marina Militare 

Lighthouses in Tuscany
Lighthouses completed in 1788
Portoferraio
Lighthouses in Italy